Zanitas and Lazarus (died March 27, 326) were martyrs of the Christian church in the Sasanid Empire.

They were monks. With their companions Maruthas, Narses, Helias, Mares, Abibus, Sembeeth, and Sabas, were arrested and imprisoned at Bardiaboch during the persecutions of Persian king Shapur II. After being comforted and inspired by Jonas and Barachius, they withstood torture and were killed on March 27, 326.
 
In 339 Shapur II began the second and fiercest persecution of Christians in the Parthian kingdom. This persecution lasted for 40 years until Shapur died in 379. The church historian Socrates records sixteen thousand unnamed Christians killed at this time including 22 bishops and hundreds of clergy
Traditions records that the brothers Saints Jonas and Barachisius heard about the persecution and went to Bardiaboch, where the nine were awaiting execution. they visited the monks in jail on the eve of the execution and found they had been tortured. Jonas and Barachisius gave comforting words to the prisoners and were themselves executed days later.
The eleven martyrs were buried by Habdisotes, a notable Christian of that town.

They are commemorated as pre-congregational saints in the Roman Catholic Church on March 27.

See also

 Martyrs of Persia under Shapur II

References

Year of birth missing
326 deaths
Persian saints
Groups of Christian martyrs of the Roman era
4th-century Christian martyrs
Christians in the Sasanian Empire
People executed by the Sasanian Empire